FC AGMK Olmaliq (Uzbek: OKMK Olmaliq futbol klubi / ОКМК Олмалиқ футбол клуби; Russian: Футбольный клуб АГМК) is a professional football club based in Olmaliq (Tashkent Region) also spelled as Almalyk of central Uzbekistan, that competes in the Uzbekistan Super League. Their futsal club participated in the AFC Futsal Club Championship.

History  
Football club AGMK founded in 2004. The general sponsor and the team owner – JSC "Almalyk mining and metallurgical plant". The official name the football club AGMK is the abbreviation which comes from the name of the company in Russian (Russian: Алмалыкский горно-металлургический комбинат / Almalykskiy gorno-mettalurgichesky kombinat). "Almalyk mining and metallurgical plant" as successor to the disbanded football club "Metallurg Almalyk" who participated in 1966–1988 years in the Second League of the USSR championship. In the early years of founding, the club was called the AGMK.

In 2004, the AGMK plant has applied to participate in the Uzbekistan First League (today called Uzbekistan Pro League) and soon the offer was accepted. In his debut season, AGMK finished sixth. In the season 2005-2006, the club finished in tenth place. At the end of the 2007 season, AGMK finished in seventh place in the Uzbekistan First League but were allowed to participate in the Uzbekistan High League (today called Uzbekistan Super League) due to the fact that two clubs who were supposed to participate in the High League refused to participate for financial reasons.

In his debut season in the High League, the club finished in tenth place out of sixteen teams and reached the semi-finals of the Uzbekistan Cup. In that season, the top scorer of the club became the Lithuanian Arturas Fomenka scored six goals. In 2009, the club changed its name to FK Olmaliq chief coach of the club was appointed a prominent Uzbek football player and aspiring coach Igor Shkvyrin. In that season, FK Olmaliq set your best performance in their history of appearances in the High League – fourth place.

In the season 2010 and 2011, the FK Olmaliq took eleventh place in the High League. In 2012, the club finished in eighth place, and the following season in fifth place. In the season of 2014, FK Olmaliq took the sixth place in the championship. In 2015, he repeated his success of 2014 and was again the sixth. In the 2016 season unexpectedly at the end of the season took 13-th place, and by the end of the 2017 season became the seventh team in the High League.

In early January 2018, the club announced a return to the old and original name AGMK Olmaliq, under which he performed from 2004 to 2008, before renaming in FK Olmaliq in 2009.

Club names

Domestic history

Continental record

Stadium
FK Olmaliq played plays its matches at the OKMK Sport Majmuasi. Old Olmaliq stadion was built in 1960 and holds 11,000 spectators and had name Metallurg Stadium. In 2011 club started with building of new modern 12.000-all-seater stadium, New Olmaliq Stadium located not far from Metallurg Stadium (Olmaliq). The new Olmaliq sporting complex also includes indoor courts for volleyball, handball, basketball, kurash and outdoor and indoor tennis courts. The construction works were finished in February 2014. The old stadium remains and will be renovated. The whole sporting complex with New Olmaliq Stadium was officially named OKMK Sport Majmuasi.

The opening ceremony of the stadium was held on 16 March 2014 with the first official of 2014 Uzbek League match FK Olmaliq - Metallurg Bekabad ended with 3:2 win of FK Olmaliq.

On 27 May 2014 OKMK Sport Majmuasi hosted the first international match, friendly match Uzbekistan – Oman ended with score 0:1.

Players

Current squad

Honours

Domestic

Uzbekistan Cup:
Winners (1): 2018
Runners-up (2): 2019, 2020

Managers

References

External links
 Official website 
 FC Olmaliq- Weltfussballarchiv
 PFC Olmaliq- UzPFL
 FC Olmaliq- soccerway

Football clubs in Uzbekistan
2004 establishments in Uzbekistan
Association football clubs established in 2004
Mining association football teams